The Yorktown class was a class of three aircraft carriers built for the United States Navy and completed shortly before World War II, the , , and . They immediately followed , the first U.S. aircraft carrier built as such, and benefited in design from experience with Ranger and the earlier , which were conversions into carriers of two battlecruisers that were to be scrapped to comply with the Washington Naval Treaty, an arms limitation accord.

These ships bore the brunt of the fighting in the Pacific during 1942, and two of the three were lost: Yorktown, sunk at the Battle of Midway, and Hornet, sunk in the Battle of the Santa Cruz Islands.

Enterprise, the sole survivor of the class, was the most decorated ship of the U.S. Navy in the Second World War. After efforts to save her as a museum ship failed, she was scrapped in 1958.

Development

In an early example of modern weapons development, the Yorktown class was a result of standardized war gaming exercises using  and the Newport Naval War College. Analysis of the results, combined with lessons learned from operations with the large converted battlecruiser Lexington-class in comparison with the smaller purpose-built Ranger, highlighted the greater flexibility presented by large air groups and fast ships.  These became, along with torpedo protection, the guiding principles in the Yorktown class designs.

With the commissioning of USS Ranger, the USN had 54,400 tons of carrier construction left under the Washington Treaty. Initially, the development plan for the class envisioned a 17,000-ton design that would allow the Navy to build three ships and stay within the 135,000-ton Washington Naval Treaty limit on aircraft carrier tonnage.  However, this design could not achieve the desired high operating speed without sacrificing protection features and air wing capacity.  In addition, the London Treaty of 1930 required that the USS Langley be added into the tonnage limits, no longer being classified as an "experimental" carrier. In the end, the Navy chose instead to build two 19,000-ton carriers that could fulfill the design vision; though smaller in displacement than the USS Lexington class and a nominal 27,000-ton limit design, the ships retained high-powered machinery, hull volume and flight deck area that allowed for a fast and capacious design, but also improved durability and provided close to an all-weather ability to launch aircraft. These were versatile carriers that could carry and operate over 80 aircraft, almost as many as the much larger Lexington class.

Plans initially called for a flush deck with no island.  However, the Royal Navy had constructed several flush-deck carriers, and the problems encountered in those designs were known to the US Navy; the US naval attaché in Britain, J.C. Hunsacker, reported that  had problems exhausting boiler smoke without proper smoke stacks.  In addition to the engineering constraints, it was becoming evident that larger air groups and antiaircraft batteries would be easier to command from an island design. In the end BuAer retracted all demands for flush decked carriers.

Conversion of USS Langley into a seaplane tender allowed the Navy to fill in the remaining available treaty tonnage with a scaled-down version of the class, which became the 14,700-ton . Service experience validated the advantages of the larger hull design. USS Ranger proved to be unable to withstand rougher weather in the Pacific, while lack of virtually any protective features soon relegated her to a training ship. USS Wasps lack of torpedo protection contributed to her loss in the Pacific theater.

The abandonment of the arms limitation treaties system in 1937 allowed the US to begin building more carriers, and the first of this new carrier program was Hornet, another of the class, commissioned in 1941. Improvements to the Yorktown design and freedom from the Washington Treaty limitations brought about the s.

The Yorktowns carried a seldom-used catapult on the hangar deck. This catapult was subsequently eliminated from U.S. carriers as it was relatively useless in operation. The hangar-deck catapult was removed from Enterprise and Hornet in late June 1942.

All three ships of the Yorktown class were built at the Newport News Shipbuilding Company, Newport News, Virginia.

Ships in class

Operational history
The three ships of this class are noted for bearing the brunt of the fighting in the early months of the Pacific War, most notably during the Battle of the Coral Sea, the Battle of Midway, and the Guadalcanal campaign. During the latter campaign, Hornet and later Enterprise had the distinction of being the only operational carrier in the United States Pacific Fleet.

Enterprise was at sea on the morning of 7 December 1941 (the day of the Attack on Pearl Harbor). That evening, Enterprise, screened by six of her Grumman F4F Wildcat fighters, put into Pearl Harbor for fuel and supplies. The aircraft were fired on by anti-aircraft defenses, and one pilot radioed in, reporting that his aircraft was an American aircraft. Enterprise later participated in the first offensive actions against Japan, launching attacks against the Marshall Islands, Wake, and Marcus Island.

Yorktown transferred to the Pacific on 16 December 1941 and later raided the Gilbert Islands in the same operation as Enterprise. Damaged by Japanese carrier aircraft, Yorktown returned to Pearl Harbor and was hastily repaired in time to participate in the Battle of Midway.

Hornet spent the first months of the war training in Norfolk, Virginia, before being assigned to the Doolittle Raid. Loaded with a squadron of B-25 bombers and escorted by Enterprise, the ship launched the first air raids against the Japanese mainland.

All three ships of the class saw action during the Battle of Midway (4–7 June 1942), Enterprise and Yorktown aircraft were responsible for sinking all four Japanese carriers engaged in the battle, while Hornet assisted in the sinking of one heavy cruiser and severely damaging another. All three carriers suffered severe losses among their air groups, most notably Hornets Torpedo Squadron 8, which lost 15 aircraft with only a single surviving airman. Yorktown was damaged by aerial bombs and torpedoes and abandoned on 4 June. Later re-manned by repair crews, the ship was spotted and torpedoed by a Japanese submarine and eventually sank on 7 June 1942.

Enterprise was assigned to the invasion of Guadalcanal and participated in preliminary strikes on the island. She suffered moderate damage during the Battle of the Eastern Solomons but was repaired in time to join Hornet in the Battle of the Santa Cruz Islands. Hornet was severely damaged during the latter engagement and had to be abandoned. Attempts to scuttle the ship by her escorts failed, and she was left adrift before finally being sunk by Japanese destroyers on 27 October 1942. Enterprise was again damaged during the battle, but was repaired enough to deliver her air group to Guadalcanal, where it participated in the Naval Battle of Guadalcanal. Enterprise aircraft assisted in finishing off the heavily damaged battleship  and were instrumental in destroying the Japanese transport fleet, thereby ending Japan's last serious attempt at reclaiming the island.

After a lengthy overhaul and repair period at Bremerton, Washington, Enterprise joined the Central Pacific Fleet as part of the Fast Carrier Task Force. She participated in every major invasion of the Central Pacific campaign, including the Battle of the Philippine Sea and the Battle of Leyte Gulf. Her air groups contributed to the development of carrier night operations, executing a night air raid on Truk Lagoon and operating as a specialized night air group towards the end of the war.

Enterprise was finally put out of action on 14 May 1945 when she was struck in the forward elevator by a kamikaze aircraft flown by Japanese pilot Lt. Shunsuke Tomiyasu, which destroyed the elevator and severely damaged her hangar deck. She was still out of action on V-J Day but was subsequently fitted out for Operation Magic Carpet, ferrying over 10,000 veterans home from Europe.

By the end of World War II, Enterprise had been considerably modified. Her final displacement was 32,060 tons and her final armament was 8 single 5-inch/38 caliber DP guns, 40 40 mm Bofors AA guns, 6 quad and 8 twin (replacing the ineffective 1.1"/75 caliber gun quad mounts which the Yorktown class had initially been fitted with) and 50 single 20 mm Oerlikon AA cannons. The Yorktowns had proved to be vulnerable to torpedoes, and while undergoing repairs at Bremerton, Washington, from July to October, 1943, Enterprise received an extensive refit, which included an anti-torpedo blister that significantly improved her underwater protection.

With the commissioning of the more advanced Essex and  carriers, Enterprise was surplus for post war needs. She entered New York Naval Shipyard on 18 January 1946 for deactivation, and was decommissioned on 17 February 1947. Stricken from the list in 1959 after multiple attempts to preserve her as a museum and memorial, ex-Enterprise met her fate in the breaker's yards at Kearny, New Jersey, in 1960, although several artifacts were retained.

See also

List of ship classes of the Second World War

Notes

References

External links
Naval Aviation news July August 1994
Builder's Plan USS Yorktown c.1940

Aircraft carrier classes
 
 Yorktown-class aircraft carrier